Guruvayur Express is one of the express trains of Southern Railway zone in India, which runs between Chennai Egmore in Tamilnadu to Guruvayur in Kerala. This train is the successor the erstwhile  (MS) - (CHTS) Mixed Express. The Mixed Express stopped running after (CHTS) was closed down for Passenger services in 2000.

Background 
Earlier it used to connect (CHTS) with state capital of Kerala, Thiruvananthapuram and was later extended to Nagercoil, Madurai and then Chennai. (CHTS) was closed down for Passenger services in 2000. Hence the Train was introduced in 2003 to run between capital of Tamil Nadu, Chennai and the temple city, Guruvayur in Thrissur district of Kerala via Tiruchirapalli, Madurai, Tirunelveli, Nagercoil, Trivandrum the capital city of Kerala, Ernakulam & Thrissur. A link of the train runs up to Thoothukudi as it was announced by the Railway Minister of India in the 2013-2014 Railway Budget. After December 2020, this link train was suspended.

Route 
At present the service leaves Chennai Egmore daily in the morning, and reaches Guruvayur the next morning. In return it leaves Guruvayur daily at night and reaches Chennai Egmore night of next day. It runs through Chengalpattu, Villupuram, Vriddhachalam, Trichy, Dindigul, Madurai Junction, Virudhunagar, Tirunelveli, Nagercoil Junction (Reversal Done), Thiruvananthapuram Central, Kollam, Kayamkulam, Ernakulam Junction, Thrissur, Punkunnam.

Schedule 
It connects the important cities of Chennai, Villupuram, Tiruchirappalli, Madurai and Tirunelveli in Tamil Nadu with Thiruvananthapuram, Kollam, Kochi and Thrissur in Kerala. It longitudinally crosses almost the whole state of Tamil Nadu. It runs via Alleppey route in Kerala. In return direction the express train leaves  at 22.35 hrs daily as Train Number 16128 and reaches  the next day at 20.45 hrs via the same route.

See also
 Tambaram-Nagercoil Antyodaya Express
 Pallavan Express
 Pothigai Express
 Silambu Express
 Pandian Express
 Rockfort Express
 Nellai Express
 Pearl City Express
 Uzhavan Express
 Vaigai Express

Notes

References

Named passenger trains of India
Rail transport in Kerala
Rail transport in Tamil Nadu
Transport in Chennai
Transport in Guruvayur
Express trains in India